"I Don't Really Care" is a song by American hip hop recording artist Waka Flocka Flame. It was released on March 20, 2012 as the second single from his second studio album Triple F Life: Friends, Fans & Family (2012). The song, produced by Skyy Stylez and Troy Taylor, features a guest appearance from American R&B singer Trey Songz. The song debuted and peaked at number 64 on the Billboard Hot 100 for the chart week dating April 14, 2012: it also peaked at number 73 on the Hot R&B/Hip-Hop Songs chart and at number 20 on the Hot Rap Songs chart.

Music video
A music video for the song, directed by Taj Stansberry, was filmed in Atlanta in April 2012 and premiered on May 1, 2012.

Track listing
Digital download
"I Don't Really Care" (Explicit) (featuring Trey Songz) – 3:55
"I Don't Really Care" (Clean) (featuring Trey Songz) – 3:42

Charts

References

External links
 

2012 songs
2012 singles
Waka Flocka Flame songs
Trey Songz songs
Songs written by Trey Songz
Songs written by Waka Flocka Flame